China National Radio (CNR; ;) is the national radio network of China, headquartered in Beijing.

History
The infrastructure began with a transmitter from Moscow to set up its first station in Yan'an (延安).  It used the call sign XNCR ("New China Radio") for broadcasts, and is the first radio station set up by the Chinese Communist Party in 1940.

In the west, it was known as the Yan'an New China Radio Station broadcasting two hours daily.  In China, it was called the Yan'an Xinhua Broadcasting Station, which was established on 30 December 1940.

On 25 March 1949, it was renamed Shanbei Xinhua Broadcasting Station after it departed from Yan'an. It began to broadcast in Peiping under the name of Peiping Xinhua Broadcasting Station. On December5, 1949, it was officially named to Central People's Broadcasting Station, two months after the establishment of the People's Republic of China. The station offered 15.5 hours of daily programming broadcast to most parts of China.

Mao Zedong emphasized that all citizens should listen to the station on 5 May 1941.  The "Central Press and Broadcasting Bureau" was the driver in pushing all schools, army units, and public organizations of all levels to install loud public speakers and radio transmitters.  By the 1960s, 70 million speakers were installed reaching the rural population of 400 million.

The Central People's Broadcasting Station innovated wired transmissions, which were linked to the commonly found telephone poles hanging with loud speakers. Local stations were usually located in county seats or in individual factories or production brigades. It was part of Mao's ideology of delivering "Politics on Demand".  The station served as the headquarters for propaganda during the Cultural Revolution.

During the Great Proletarian Cultural Revolution, Central Radio offered extensive daily programming schedules, beginning with The East is Red. The majority of the daily schedule consisted of news and cultural programming, broken up with specialized programs on topics like morning calisthenics, children's shows, and broadcasts of military interest.

The station was later renamed China National Radio as its English name. It would move to a new building in 1998.

Today, CNR forms the national radio service of the state-owned China Media Group, continuing its mission to broadcast a variety of radio programmes to listeners all over China and around the world.

Services

Radio stations

TV channels
 CNR Care: Mainly Healthy Information, stopped streaming at 1 July 2019.
 CNR Mall: TV Shopping Channel – a joint venture with QVC.

See also
 Broadcasting Corporation of China (First Nationalist Party Radio)
 China Radio International
 China Central Television

Notes

References

External links 

 

Chinese-language radio stations
Multilingual broadcasters
1940 establishments in China
Mass media companies established in 1940
Radio stations established in 1940
Mass media in Beijing
China Media Group